George Albert Pargiter, Baron Pargiter, CBE (16 March 1897 – 16 January 1982) was a British Labour Party Member of Parliament (MP).

He was elected as MP for Spelthorne at the 1945 general election. After boundary changes made that seat marginal, he changed constituency to win the Southall seat at the 1950 general election.  He held that constituency until his retirement at the 1966 general election.

Having been appointed a Commander of the Order of the British Empire (CBE) in the 1961 New Year Honours, he was created a life peer on 9 June 1966 taking the title Baron Pargiter, of Southall in the London Borough of Ealing.

References

External links 
 

1897 births
1982 deaths
Amalgamated Engineering Union-sponsored MPs
Labour Party (UK) MPs for English constituencies
Labour Party (UK) life peers
Borough of Spelthorne
People from Southall
UK MPs 1945–1950
UK MPs 1950–1951
UK MPs 1951–1955
UK MPs 1955–1959
UK MPs 1959–1964
UK MPs 1964–1966
UK MPs who were granted peerages
Life peers created by Elizabeth II
Commanders of the Order of the British Empire